The 1973 DFB-Ligapokal Final decided the winner of the 1972–73 DFB-Ligapokal, a knockout football cup competition.

The match was played on 6 June 1973 at the Volksparkstadion in Hamburg. Hamburger SV won the match 4–0 against Borussia Mönchengladbach for the title.

Teams

Route to the final 

The DFB-Ligapokal began with the group stage. Four teams would play each other in a home and away format, with the group winners advancing to the knockout stage. The knockout stage, beginning with the quarter-finals was a knockout cup competition. Teams would play each other home and away, and the winner on aggregate would advance. If tied on aggregate, extra time was used to determine the winner. If still tied, a replay would be necessary.

Note: In all results below, the score of the finalist is given first (H: home; A: away).

Match

Details

See also 
 1972–73 DFB-Pokal

References 

1973
Hamburger SV matches
Borussia Mönchengladbach matches
1972–73 in German football cups